John Harrison Nichols (born February 3, 1959) is a liberal and progressive American journalist and author. He is the National Affairs correspondent for The Nation and associate editor of The Capital Times. Books authored or co-authored by Nichols include The Genius of Impeachment and The Death and Life of American Journalism.

Personal life 
Nichols grew up in Union Grove, Wisconsin. He lives in Madison, Wisconsin with his wife Mary Bottari, who is the deputy director of the Center for Media and Democracy.

Journalism 
Nichols holds a master's degree from Columbia University Graduate School of Journalism and bachelor's degree from the University of Wisconsin–Parkside. He used to be the national correspondent for newspapers in Toledo and Pittsburgh.  He lives in Madison and works as an editor for The Capital Times. Nichols is Washington correspondent for The Nation and writes "The Beat" blog for the magazine. He is a regular contributor to In These Times and The Progressive. He appears in the documentary films Outfoxed, Unprecedented: The 2000 Presidential Election, Orwell Rolls in His Grave, and Call It Democracy. Nichols is co-founder, with Robert McChesney and Josh Silver, of Free Press.

Nichols is a regular radio and TV guest of many liberal and progressive talk shows, including The Ed Show with Ed Schultz on MSNBC, Up with Chris Hayes on MSNBC, The Drive Home with Sly on The Big Oldies WEKZ 93.7 (Monroe, WI), Thom Hartmann, and Jon Wiener on KPFK in Los Angeles.

Bibliography

Books 
 It's the Media, Stupid! By John Nichols and Robert W. McChesney. New York: Seven Stories Press, 2000.
 Jews for Buchanan: Did You Hear the One About the Theft of the American Presidency?. By John Nichols with David Deschamps. New York: New Press, 2001. 
 Our Media, Not Theirs: The Democratic Struggle Against Corporate Media. By Robert W. McChesney and John Nichols. New York: Seven Stories, 2002.
 Dick: The Man Who Is President / The Rise and Rise of Richard B. Cheney: Unlocking the Mysteries of the Most Powerful Vice President in American History. By John Nichols. New York: New Press, 2004/2005.
 The Genius of Impeachment: The Founders' Cure for Royalism. By John Nichols. New York: New Press, 2006.
 Tragedy & Farce: How the American Media Sell Wars, Spin Elections and Destroy Democracy. By John Nichols and Robert W. McChesney. New York: New Press, 2006
 The Death and Life of American Journalism: The Media Revolution that Will Begin the World Again. By Robert W. McChesney and John Nichols. New York: Nation Books, 2010.
 The "S" Word: a Short History of An American Tradition ... Socialism. By John Nichols. New York: Verso, 2011.
 Uprising: How Wisconsin Renewed the Politics of Protest, from Madison to Wall Street. By John Nichols. New York: Nation Books, 2012.
 Dollarocracy: How the Money-and-Media-Election Complex is Destroying America. By John Nichols and Robert W. McChesney. New York: Nation Books, 2013.
 People Get Ready: The Fight Against a Jobless Economy and a Citizenless Democracy. By Robert W. McChesney & John Nichols. New York: Nation Books 2016.
 Horsemen of the Trumpocalypse: A Field Guide to the Most Dangerous People in America. by John Nichols. New York: Nation Books, August 2017. 
 The Fight for the Soul of the Democratic Party: The Enduring Legacy of Henry Wallace's Anti-Fascist, Anti-Racist Politics by John Nichols. Verso Books, April 2020. 
 Coronavirus Criminals and Pandemic Profiteers: Accountability for Those Who Caused the Crisis, by John Nichols. Verso Books, Jan. 2022. 

 Articles 
 2009: John Nichols and Robert W. McChesney. "The Death and Life of Great American Newspapers", The Nation.
 2010: John Nichols and Robert W. McChesney. "How to Save Journalism", The Nation.

 References 

 External links 

Column and blog archive at The Nation''
John Nichols page at the Capital Times

Democracy Now! - interview appearances
Interview with John Nichols by JK Fowler for The Mantle on March 20, 2011

20th-century American journalists
21st-century American journalists
20th-century American writers
21st-century American writers
American alternative journalists
American male journalists
American media critics
American political writers
Journalists from Wisconsin
The Nation (U.S. magazine) people
Columbia University Graduate School of Journalism alumni
University of Wisconsin–Parkside alumni
Members of the Democratic Socialists of America
People from Union Grove, Wisconsin
People from Madison, Wisconsin
1959 births
Living people